Humberto Grondona (born 27 October 1957) is an Argentine football coach.

Career
He is the son of Julio Grondona, the late president of the Argentine Football Association. During the 2014 FIFA World Cup, match tickets were sold on the black market with his name printed on.

In 2013, he coached the Argentina national under-17 football team at the 2013 South American Under-17 Football Championship to their third title.

A year later, he coached the Argentina national under-20 football team at the 2015 South American Youth Football Championship.

Honours
Argentina U17
South American Under-17 Football Championship: 2013
Argentina U20
South American Youth Football Championship: 2015

References 

Argentine football managers
Living people
Arsenal de Sarandí footballers
1957 births
Association footballers not categorized by position
Argentine footballers
Club Atlético Tigre footballers
Deportivo Morón footballers
Huracán de Comodoro Rivadavia footballers
Unión La Calera managers
Argentina national under-20 football team managers
Arsenal de Sarandí managers